Thomas Marlow (15 December 1878 – 13 August 1954) was an English cricketer. Marlow was a left-handed batsman who bowled left-arm slow-medium. He was born at Anstey, Leicestershire.

Marlow joined the Leicestershire ground staff in 1898, and initially played in the second team.  He made his first-class debut against Sussex in the 1900 County Championship at Grace Road. Marlow made fourteen further first-class appearances for the county, the last of which came against Essex in the 1903 County Championship. In his total of fifteen first-class matches, he took 31 wickets at an average of 27.29, with best figures of 6/50. One of two five wicket hauls he took, his best figures came against Hampshire in the 1902 County Championship. A poor tailend batsman, Marlow scored 46 runs at a batting average of 3.28.

He died at Leicester, Leicestershire on 13 August 1954.

References

External links
Thomas Marlow at ESPNcricinfo
Thomas Marlow at CricketArchive

1878 births
1954 deaths
People from Anstey, Leicestershire
Cricketers from Leicestershire
English cricketers
Leicestershire cricketers